The Mostarsko Blato Hydroelectric Power Station is hydroelectric power station on the Lištica river/Jasenica in Bosnia and Herzegovina, with an installed capacity of 60 MW.

References

Hydroelectric power stations in Bosnia and Herzegovina
Mostar